Lynne Kelly (born March 1, 1969) is an American author of books for children and young adults. Her first novel, Chained, was published in May 2012 by Farrar, Straus, & Giroux/Margaret Ferguson Books.

Biography 

Lynne Kelly is an author of middle grade and young adult fiction. She was born in Galesburg, Illinois and grew up in Houston, Texas. While studying for a psychology degree from Stephen F. Austin State University in Nacogdoches, she started working as a sign language interpreter and continued that career after graduation. Kelly became certified as a special education teacher in 2002, and started working on her first novel, Chained, while teaching in Spring ISD near Houston.

Kelly currently resides in the Houston, Texas area.

Works 

Chained, Farrar, Straus, & Giroux/Margaret Ferguson Books, May 2012

Chained was also published by Penguin India and Bayard (France) in 2014, and by Suzuki Publishing (Japan) in 2015.

Song For a Whale, was released in February 2019 by Random House/Delacorte

Reception 

Chained is a 2013 South Asia Book Award Honor and a recipient of the Society of Children's Books Writers and Illustrator's Crystal Kite Award. The book was reviewed in Kirkus, The Horn Book and School Library Journal.

Awards
 2013 South Asia Book Award Honor
 The Society of Children's Books Writers and Illustrator's Crystal Kite Award

References

External links 

Author website
Macmillan Chained Page
The Lucky 13's Interview with Lynne Kelly
Cynsations Interview with Lynne Kelly

American children's writers
1969 births
Living people
People from Galesburg, Illinois
Stephen F. Austin State University alumni
Writers from Houston